Maidstone Grammar School for Girls, also known as Maidstone Girls Grammar School (MGGS), is a selective grammar school in Maidstone, UK. It operates under the 11-plus exam system, in which students take an exam at the end of primary school in order to be accepted at this school. The school is primarily a single-sex girls' school, however it also incorporates a sixth form college which is mixed.

History 
Maidstone Grammar School for Girls was founded in 1887 by the Wardens and Assistants of Rochester Bridge, at a cost of £4,500. It was originally located at Albion Place when it opened in January 1888 with 18 pupils. The current building was opened in Great Buckland in 1938. The new site was previously the home to Great Buckland, a 17th-century mansion once owned by the Earl of Aylesford, which was knocked down to make room for the new building; at the point of demolition, the mansion was unsafe and was in a state of disrepair. Additional buildings have since been added, including a large extension to the old building, and several separate blocks of classrooms and a large sports hall. The school used to have an onsite swimming pool for students to use, but this was later filled to make room for a car park.

The school became a voluntary controlled grammar school since 1944, and it returned to the 11 plus entry examination in 1993.

Previous Head Teachers

Air Raid Shelters
During the second world war, the school was believed to be at high risk due to its location at the intersection of two train lines, the Medway Valley line and the Maidstone line. As a result, three separate air raid shelters were constructed on the school site; two at the front and one at the rear of the main building. The largest of the three shelters is located at the southern side of the site, under what is a building that is now known as 'T Block'. This shelter differs in design from the others, being a large open room; though a corner is filled with concrete for the foundations of the building above. The two other shelters that are on the northern and western sides of the site are made of a series of corridors, equipped with benches and black-boards. The shelters were constructed at the time to keep students from the main building so teaching could continue, but it is believed the structures would not survive a direct hit.

Since 2018 the school has been opening the northern shelter to local schools, with future plans to open the additional shelters on the site.

Buildings
The site is made up of 5 separate buildings. The largest of these is ‘A block’, referred often as the ‘main building’. This is the original building which houses the main hall, history, modern foreign languages, religious studies, chemistry, physics, the two drama studios, the Mary Smith library and the gym. A block is a symmetrical building, consisting of two quadrangles surrounded by corridors, similar to cloisters, which originally had no windows and were open roofed; both have since been installed. The main hall is the home of the largest stage in the school, with an additional gallery at the back.

In the late 1970s, a large extension was added to the eastern side of ‘A Block’; this extension is known as ‘C block’. This section of the school is the home of Maths and design technology. It also has a large room on the upper floor which was formerly the sixth form common room, but is now known as the small hall.

In 2010 the school was given approval for a new building. Construction commenced in January 2011 and was planned to be completed by Christmas, however due to delays, it was officially opened in April 2012 for students. The new building, called Buckland house, houses sixth-form and Art and English departments, releasing space in the main buildings for further expansion. A small, mobile building (known as a second N Block) was thought to be knocked down as due to the addition of the new building, but will now be refurbished.

The newest addition to the school site is the Molly Tipples Sports Hall, named after the late Chairman of Governors. In 2015, further planning permission was granted to build the replacement sports hall. The hall contains a large multi-use games area, equipped with retractable basketball hoops and a sound system. On the upper floor of the building there are two dance studios, which have now been temporarily fitted to be used as changing rooms. A request for planning permission to extend the sports hall was placed in May 2019. The planning permission was granted in October 2019. The extension would add additional changing facilities, as well as showers and one additional classroom.

RAG Week 

RAG Week, standing for raising and giving, is a weeklong charity event which runs annually in the last week before the Christmas term. The event has become tradition at the school, running for over 50 years. The school often raises over £4,000 each year. Each day throughout the week has a separate theme and lunch time performance, organised and selected by the head students for that year. The lunch time performances often involve large portions of the staff faculty. These performances often follow a similar format each year; a pantomime, a television based re-enactment, a video section and a musical performance. All proceeds raised are split, with half going to the school’s partner school, The Himalaya Milan Secondary School, and the other half split further again then given to one local charity and one national charity.

Houses 

The school operates a house system consisting of six different houses; Vikings, Normans, Danes, Britons, Saxons and Romans. These houses compete in four annual competitions which encourage teamwork and team spirit and are a vibrant part of MGGS life. Perhaps the most popular competition is the House Arts Cup which takes place at the end of October. The event celebrates the arts of song, dance and acting and alternates between these each year. As well as  House Arts the other competitions are Sports Day, Inter-house Rounders and Science Quiz. The houses are led by three year 13 students, who are elected into their role of House Leaders by their house.

From 2006, the House Captain election process, which had previously been decided entirely by votes from members of the house (both staff and students) was decided by interview as well as votes. Elections take place at the end of the second term before year thirteen students go on study leave.
Every so often, house captains organise assemblies on set topics, which feature different house vents that students can take part in.

Incidents

May 2019 Prom Incident
On 11 May 2019, it was reported that following several pranks performed by students at the end of the year, the year 11 prom would be canceled. According to the school there were several unsafe pranks that included lubricating stairways and putting itching powder on the toilets. It is reported that the itching powder sent several students to hospital due to allergic reactions. Several parents took to organising their own prom, which went ahead on the same day to replace the canceled event.

October 2017 Admissions Incident
Following a complaint, a local government inspector found that the school was failing to follow its admissions policy and was therefore in 'breach of statutory guidance'. It was found the school was applying different entry requirements into the sixth-form for internal and external applicants. The school vowed to change its policy to give all applicants fair and equal requirements.

Notable alumni (Old Girls) 

 Dame Karen Dunnell, National Statistician & Registrar-General, Office for National Statistics
 Carole Goble, Professor of Computer Science at the University of Manchester
 Alison Noble, Professor at the University of Oxford
 Lizzy Yarnold, skeleton racer who won two Winter Olympic gold medals (2014 in Sochi, 2018 in PyeongChang)
 Mia Mckenna-Bruce,  actress and dancer in The Dumping Ground

References

External links 
 Maidstone Grammar School for Girls website

Girls' schools in Kent
Grammar schools in Kent
Schools in Maidstone
Educational institutions established in 1887
1887 establishments in England

Foundation schools in Kent